Osaiasi Kupu Vanisi (born 30 November 1972) is a former professional rugby union footballer who played at flanker for the Highlanders and Hurricanes in the Super Rugby competition. He also made a single appearance for the All Blacks in 1999.

(Vanisi's stats by seasons)

Playing career

Vanisi was born in Nuku'alofa, Tonga and his father Vainikolo played for the Tongan nation team in the 1960s, but the family moved to Dunedin, New Zealand in his youth. He made his provincial debut for Otago in 1994 and was a member of the original Highlanders squad in 1996, but the presence of Josh Kronfeld - one of the dominant openside flankers in world rugby in the 1990s - severely curtailed his opportunities for both sides.

In 1999, Vanisi shifted to Wellington and the Hurricanes, where he would flourish with increased playing time. A strong debut season with the Hurricanes saw him called up to the All Blacks in 1999, where he made a single appearance in a non-test game against New Zealand A.

While he wouldn't again feature for New Zealand internationally, Vanisi continued as a regular squad member for both Wellington and the Hurricanes through 2003, serving as a veteran mentor to rising stars like Jerry Collins and Rodney So'oialo.

He finished off his legendary career with a three-year stint in Japan before retiring.

References

External links
 All Blacks profile
 Hurricanes profile

1972 births
New Zealand international rugby union players
Living people
New Zealand rugby union players
Rugby union players from Dunedin
Rugby union flankers
Tongan emigrants to New Zealand
People educated at King's High School, Dunedin